Paige Carlyle Howard (born February 5, 1985) is an American actress. She is a sister of actress Bryce Dallas Howard and daughter of director and actor Ron Howard.

Education
Howard attended New York University's Tisch School of the Arts.

Career
Howard made her professional stage debut at the Vineyard Theatre in New York City, playing the title character in J. M. Barrie's play Mary Rose which was directed by Tina Landau.

After guest-starring roles on TV shows Medium and 90210, Howard made her feature film debut as Sue O’Malley in the 2009 comedy Adventureland. She then followed with a lead role on the web series stalkTALK, and starring roles in the indie comedies Virgin Alexander and Cheesecake Casserole, as well as the psychological thriller The Employer opposite Malcolm McDowell. Howard won Best Supporting Actress at the Los Angeles Movie Awards in 2013 for her role in The Employer.

Filmography

References

External links
 

1985 births
21st-century American actresses
American film actresses
American stage actresses
American television actresses
Paige Carlyle
Living people
Place of birth missing (living people)
Tisch School of the Arts alumni
American twins